Lohberg is a municipality in the district of Cham in Bavaria in Germany. It lies within the scenic valley of the Lamer Winkel.

References

Cham (district)